The Gower by-election of 16 September 1982 was held after the death of Labour Member of Parliament (MP) Ifor Davies on 6 June 1982. The seat was held by Labour in the by-election.

Amongst the candidates was David Burns who at the time was being held on remand over charges relating to the bombing of a British Army recruitment office in Pontypridd. A self-declared member of the 'Worker's Army for a Welsh Republic', Burns was ultimately released in 1983 after neither of the two charges were made to stand up.

Results

References

Gower by-election
By-elections to the Parliament of the United Kingdom in Welsh constituencies
Elections in Swansea
Gower by-election
1980s elections in Wales
20th century in Swansea
Gower by-election